"Journey to the Center of the Mind" is a song released by the Amboy Dukes in 1968. It reached number 16 on the Billboard charts in 1968 and number 19 in Canada.

Original recording 
"Journey to the Center of the Mind" featured a psychedelic rock, garage rock, hard rock and acid rock sound. The song features lyrics written by the Dukes' second guitarist Steve Farmer, and melody written by Ted Nugent.  The song was recorded with a higher budget than their past recordings. During the recording of the song there was a lot of tension amongst the band members, and a few of the members quit after the album was released. Released in the summer of 1968, the single helped define the psychedelic era as it peaked at # 16 on the Billboard charts.

Other versions 
The song "Journey to the Center of the Mind" was covered by Slade (as "Ambrose Slade") in 1969 on the album Beginnings, by The Ramones in 1994 on Acid Eaters and by Sun City Girls in 2001 on Libyan Dream.
"Journey to the Center of the Mind" was included in the influential compilation album Nuggets: Original Artyfacts from the First Psychedelic Era, 1965–1968, on the 1998 CD reissue, as a bonus track.

Nugent remade the song on his 2007 album Love Grenade.

The lyrics of the song are generally thought to have references to drug use.

References 

1968 singles
1968 songs
The Amboy Dukes songs
American psychedelic rock songs
Songs about drugs
Songs written by Ted Nugent